Mathilde Seigner (born 17 January 1968) is a French actress.

Early life 
Seigner was born in Paris. She is the granddaughter of actor Louis Seigner (1903–1991). She is the sister of Emmanuelle Seigner and a niece of Françoise Seigner.

Career 

Her acting performances have been confined to French-language films, but she has appeared in a number of notable productions. She won Best Actress at the Montreal World Film Festival in 2001 for her role in Betty Fisher and Other Stories and has been nominated for a César Award three times.

She studied comedy at Florent (very famous French school of theater), before making her first appearance in theaters in 1994, alongside her sister Emmanuelle in Smile Claude Miller. She received the Prix Michel Simon in 1995 for her role in Rosine. Two years later, she won a Cesar Award for Best Supporting Actress for her role in Nettoyage à sec.

She won the "Romy Schneider Prize in 1999. Mathilde Seigner is appreciated for her spontaneity and strong character, she quickly gained favor with the public, thanks to the nostalgic Une hirondelle a fait le printemps (2001) as a city dweller who discovers the joys of the countryside. She appeared in Le passager de l'été, Zone libre, and   Dance avec lui. With 3 amis, she returned to comedy, in such films as Tout pour plaire and Détrompez-vous.

She returned in 2009 with three dramatic comedies about family (Quelque chose à te dire, Trésor and Une semaine sur deux (et la moitié des vacances scolaires)). After Fini les vacances (2010), she appeared in Camping 2 and the remake of La guerre des boutons (2011).

In 2012, Seigner appeared in Dans la tourmente and Max. In September 2013, she appeared onstage. Two years after L'amour, la mort les fringues, she appeared in Nina'', a comedy in which she is the heroine alongside François Berléand and François Vincentelli, as her husband and lover, respectively.

Personal life 

From 1998 to 2001 she had an affair with the comedian Laurent Gerra.

From 2002 to 2005, she was a couple with the actor Antoine Duléry.

Since October 2006, Seigner has lived with Mathieu Petit, a cameraman; they have a son.

She is the sister-in-law of film director Roman Polanski, who married her sister Emmanuelle in 1989.

Controversies 
In 2009, Seigner signed a petition in support of her brother-in-law Roman Polanski, calling for his release after Polanski was arrested in Switzerland in relation to his 1977 charge for drugging and raping a 13-year-old girl.

On 24 February 2012, during the César Award ceremony, she interrupted the telecast when Michel Blanc won, stating she would have preferred that Joey Starr won.

Theater

Filmography

References

External links 

1968 births
Living people
French film actresses
Actresses from Paris
Cours Florent alumni
French stage actresses
French television actresses
20th-century French actresses
21st-century French actresses